Athrips flavida is a moth of the family Gelechiidae. It is found in Namibia, Angola, Nigeria and South Africa.

References

Moths described in 2010
Athrips
Moths of Africa